Vanko is a surname. Notable people with this surname include:

 Miroslav Vanko (born 1973), Slovak long-distance runner
 Radoslav Vanko (born 1983), Slovak model

Fictional characters
 Anton Vanko from Whiplash (Marvel Comics)

See also
 Vankov
 Vánky